Vale do Ribeira is a region in the south of the state of São Paulo and the northeast of the state of Paraná, Brazil.
It contains a large part of the Ribeira de Iguape River valley, from which it takes its name, as well as the coastal Iguape-Cananéia-Paranaguá estuary lagoon complex.
The region is environmentally rich, with large areas of well-preserved Atlantic Forest, but economically poor.

Location

The Vale do Ribeira is in the south of the state of São Paulo and in the north of the state of Paraná.
It includes the Ribeira de Iguape River Basin and the Iguape-Cananéia-Paranaguá estuary lagoon complex. 
It includes 22 municipalities in São Paulo and 9 in Paraná.
21 other municipalities in Paraná and 18 in São Paulo contain parts of the Ribeira basin.

Basins

Sub-basins of the Ribeira de Iguape River in São Paulo are:
Upper Ribeira in the municipalities of Barra do Chapéu, Itapirapuã Paulista, Apiaí, Itaóca, Iporanga and Ribeira
Lower Ribeira in the municipalities of Apiaí, Iporanga, Eldorado and Sete Barras
Ribeira de Iguape in the municipalities of Registro, Pariquera-Açu and Iguape
Upper Juquiá in the municipalities of São Lourenço da Serra, Juquitiba and Tapiraí
Mid Juquiá in the municipalities of Tapiraí, Juquiá and Miracatu
Lower Juquiá in the municipalities of Juquiá, Tapiraí, and Sete Barras,
São Lourenço River in the municipalities of Miracatu, Pedro de Toledo and Juquiá
Itariri River in the municipalities of Itariri and Pedro de Toledo
Una da Aldeia River in the municipality of Iguape
Pardo River in the municipality of Barra do Turvo
Jacupiranga River in the municipalities of Jacupiranga, Cajati and Registro
Coastal basins of the Iguape-Cananéia-Paranaguá estuary lagoon complex are:
Vertente Marítima Sul in the municipalities of Cananéia and Ilha Comprida
Vertente Marítima Norte in the municipality of Iguape.

Environment

The region has over 10,000 species of flora and fauna.
In 1999 the Southeast Atlantic Forest Reserve, which covered 17 municipalities in the Vale do Ribeira, was one of six regions in Brazil that were considered by UNESCO to be natural World Heritage Sites. 
There are 24 conservation units in the region, containing rare species such as cedar, palmito, cinnamon, araucaria and caxeta, and many types of bromeliad and orchid.
Preserved areas are found outside the conservation units in indigenous territories, quilombos and rural districts whose inhabitants practice small-scale subsistence agriculture.

Endangered species include the southern muriqui (Brachyteles arachnoides), jaguar (Panthera onca), ocelot (Leopardus pardalis), Pampas deer (Ozotoceros bezoarticus), black-fronted piping guan (Pipile jacutinga), broad-snouted caiman (Caiman latirostris) and red-tailed amazon (Amazona brasiliensis).
Endemic species include saw-billed hermit (Ramphodon naevius), Guiana dolphin (Sotalia guianensis), yellow-legged tinamou (Crypturellus noctivagus) and the Superagui lion tamarin (Leontopithecus caissara).

Conservation units include:

Bananal Ecological Station
Carlos Botelho State Park
Chauás Ecological Station
Ilha do Cardoso State Park
Ilhabela State Park
Intervales State Park
Juréia-Itatins Ecological Station
Pariquera Abaixo State Park
Serra do Mar State Park

Economy

Gold was mined in the region from the 17th century, and more recently other minerals.
Farms produced rice, coffee, tea and bananas.
The Vale do Ribeira became a supplier of low-cost natural resources, exploited without regard for the environment or cultural heritage.
It is one of the poorest parts of the states of São Paulo and Paraná, with low levels of education and employment.
The economically active and young population continues to migrate to other regions.
The region is close to the major industrial centers of São Paulo and Curitiba, and there are proposals to divert water to these centers.
In recent years infrastructure improvements have included making BR-116 a divided highway and construction of hydroelectric plants.

Other products include maté tea, rice, corn and flowers, and fish in the coastal portion.
There are about 80 caiçaras communities along the  Iguape-Cananéia-Paranaguá estuary lagoon complex, mainly engaged in sustainable subsistence artisanal fishing or collection of crustaceans.
There are ten Guarani villages, with families from the Mbyá and Ñandeva subgroups.
They practice subsistence agriculture and sustainable hunting and fishing.
They have been forced to move more than once when state or national parks were established on their traditional lands.

Agroforestry, producing and selling seedlings of native Atlantic Forest species, is a source of income for many communities. 
Commercialization of Juçara juice has potential.
Mariculture, including oysters, shellfish and fish, is also showing promise. 
The state and federal governments are investing in development of ecotourism and adventure tourism.
Some of the main attractions are the impressive calcareous caves such as those of Diabo, Santana, Morro Preto, Água Suja and Casa da Pedra.

Administration

São Paulo

The total population is 443,325 inhabitants, of which 114,995 live in rural areas.
There are 33 quilombola communities and 13 indigenous territories.
The municipalities that make up the region in São Paulo are:

Apiaí 
Barra do Chapéu 
Barra do Turvo 
Cajati 
Cananéia 
Eldorado 
Iguape 
Ilha Comprida 
Iporanga 
Itaóca 
Itapirapuã Paulista 
Itariri
Jacupiranga 
Juquitiba 
Juquiá 
Miracatu 
Pariquera-Açú 
Pedro de Toledo 
Registro 
Ribeira
Ribeirão Grande
Sete Barras
São Lourenço da Serra 
Tapiraí

Paraná

The total population is 100,880 inhabitants, of which 43,131 live in rural areas.
There are 12 quilombola communities.
Municipalities in Paraná that lie in the Ribeira de Iguape River iguape include:

Adrianópolis
Bocaiúva do Sul
Cerro Azul
Doutor Ulysses
Itaperuçu
Rio Branco do Sul
Tunas do Paraná

Notes

Sources

Geography of São Paulo (state)
Geography of Paraná (state)